The 2014–15 Sydney FC season was the club's 10th season since its establishment in 2004. The club participated in the A-League for the 10th time and the FFA Cup for the first time.

Players

Squad

From youth squad

Transfers in

Transfers out

Technical staff

Statistics

Squad statistics

|-
|colspan="19"|Players no longer at the club:

Preseason and friendlies
Sydney kicked off their pre-season campaign, playing a friendly against NPL NSW 2 team Macarthur Rams. They then took part in a tournament against Premier League teams Newcastle United and West Ham in New Zealand in late July. In late August they travelled to North Queensland to compete in the 2014 Townsville Football Cup during which they took on fellow A-League teams Brisbane Roar and Newcastle Jets as well as hosts Northern Fury.

Competitions

Overall

A-League

League table

Results summary

Results by round

Matches

Finals series

FFA Cup

Awards
  Wingate Townsville Football Cup Champions
 NAB Young Footballer of the Month (October) – Terry Antonis

End-of-season awards
On 28 April 2015, Sydney FC hosted their annual Sky Blue Ball and presented eight awards on the night.

References

External links
 Official Website

Sydney FC
Sydney FC seasons